BCF may refer to:

Organizations
  Balkan Communist Federation, a left-wing movement
 Baptist College of Florida, private college in Graceville, Florida
 Bendheim Center for Finance, an interdisciplinary research center of Princeton University
 Belgian Cricket Federation
 Boating Camping and Fishing, an Australian retail shop
 Border City Firm, a hooligan firm associated with Carlisle United Football Club
 British Chess Federation, former name of the English Chess Federation
 BC Ferries, British Columbia, Canada
 British Cycling Federation, former name British Cycling, the national governing body for cycle racing in Great Britain
 Burlington Coat Factory, an American national department store retailer for clothes and shoes

Science and technology 
 Base station control function, a part of the base station subsystem in a cellular telephone network
 Billion cubic feet, a unit of measurement
 Blake canonical form, a class of logical expressions
 Bioconcentration factor, the accumulation of a chemical in or on an organism when the source of the chemical is solely water
 Bromochlorodifluoromethane, used in fire extinguishers
 Buffy coat fusion, a therapy used in the field of bone marrow transplantation
 Bulked Continuous Filament, heatset artificial fibre
 Tris(pentafluorophenyl)borane, a chemical compound
 BIM Collaboration Format, a building information model file format

Other uses
Bamu language, spoken in Papua New Guinea (ISO 639-3 code: bcf)
 Boeing Converted Freighter, a type of Cargo aircraft